Vembukudi is a village in the Udayarpalayam taluk of Ariyalur district, Tamil Nadu, India.

Demographics 

 census, Vembukudi had a total population of 3,093 with 1,534 males and 1,559 females.

References 

Villages in Ariyalur district